Tumlehed is a locality situated in Göteborg Municipality, Västra Götaland County, Sweden. It had 475 inhabitants in 2010.

The area has numerous different historical sites, among them the Tumlehed rock painting.

References 

Populated places in Västra Götaland County
Populated places in Gothenburg Municipality